Geoffrey Longney (25 May 1935 – 26 September 2018) was an Australian cricketer. He played one first-class cricket match for Victoria in 1956.

See also
 List of Victoria first-class cricketers

References

External links
 

1935 births
2018 deaths
Australian cricketers
Victoria cricketers
Cricketers from Melbourne